Cheerleading is a sport that is practised all throughout the world, recently studies have showed increasing popularity in the United Kingdom. It has been noted that 'Great Britain's newfound success and passion for the sport is helping change perceptions throughout the country and the world.' The Olympic Channel produced an original 10 minute film following an English Cheerleading Team (Unity Allstars, Ruby) as an example of the increasing momentum of competitive cheerleading within the UK, and how the ongoing debate about its legitimacy of a sport is slowly diminishing, as well as an example of the increasing international aspect of the sport 

Some schools offer cheerleading as a sport or extracurricular option; a 2010 Department of Education report said that 37% of schools were offering cheerleading as an extracurricular option physical education choice.

Cheerleading is conducted through all-star, university and school teams. Many of these teams compete against other cheerleading teams at regional, national, and international levels. Cheerleading is currently not classified as a BUCS sport. There are also squads attached to some football and Rugby League teams; however, these often involve more dancing than the gymnastics and stunting elements of cheerleading.

Competitive Cheerleading 
Competitive cheerleading is a sport  that requires strength, co-ordination, focus and team-work. The discipline is more commonly and widely known as 'All Star Cheerleading'. The number of programmes in the UK that are dedicated cheerleading programmes is increasing - competitions are getting more competitive, the standard of athletes is increasing, and UK athletes are gaining places on prestigious world-class teams from North America, as well as England, Scotland, Wales and Northern Ireland being able to put together teams that compete at the World Cheerleading Championships at the highest level (and in some cases win).

In April 2017, Team England's All Girl Elite became England's first ever world champion cheerleading team when they were awarded first place at the ICU International Cheerleading Championships. 
 The following year, Team England's Coed Elite won first place at the 2018 ICU international cheerleading championships. In 2019, England's Junior all girl team competed and took the title of World Champions in the Junior Division, after coming second in 2018 and fighting hard to gain those extra edges that beat the international competition.

In 2016 the ICU World Cheerleading Championships announced it would be launching a new division for physically disabled athletes, to accompany its already successful Special Athletes division (run in partnership with the Special Olympics). Team England ParaCheer – the world’s first Adaptive Abilities team – performed a showcase at the 2016 championships; helping to launch the division and inspire other countries. The following year, when the division officially opened, Team England returned to win their first Adaptive Abilities Gold medal. UK based charity ParaCheer International, who promote the inclusion of disabled athletes in Cheerleading and helped pioneer the division, assisted with the development of the rules and scoring, and their founder Rick Rodgers (an English athlete and wheelchair user) now acts as an advisor to the International Cheer Union (the International Governing Body For Cheerleading) on disability. In 2019 Phoenix Allstars Adaptive abilities team 'Smoke' took to the floor at FC Internationals (Bournemouth) to showcase their routine and further raise the profile of Paracheer in the UK. Phoenix Allstars also provided athletes from their adaptive abilities division to the Paralympics home coming at Wembley arena in 2021.

The competitive version of the sport features many of the moves performed by Olympic gymnasts, including tumbles and complicated jumps, as well as the balances and team work you'd see from sports acrobatic teams.

The main organisations hosting competitions in the UK are Scotcheer (Scottish National Championship), The British Cheer Association National Championships (BCA), ICC (British open cheer and dance competitions), The Cheer and Dance Internationals (Future Cheer),  UKCA (UK Cheerleading Association)  and Legacy Cheer and Dance. The governing body is Sportcheer UK, an umbrella organisation comprising SportCheer England, SportCheer Wales, SportCheer Scotland  and SportCheer NI - recognised by the International Cheer Union (ICU) the International Governing Body for Cheerleading - recognised as such by the International Olympic Committee (of which Cheerleading is a member sport). UK teams compete in various national competitors throughout the year to win a 'bid' from one of these competition providers in order to qualify to attend USASF Worlds the following season. 'Bids' are awarded to teams in various levels of paid or unpaid sponsorship, and athletes/parents pay to subsidise the rest of their trip to Florida, USA to compete.

One particular cheerleading programme, the Ascension Eagles of the London Borough of Newham, has received attention and awards for its positive impact in its economically disadvantaged neighbourhood. In April 2014 Crimson Heat Tigers Cheer based in Reading, won the COA (Cheerleaders of America)  National title in Florida, gaining the USA Champions title.  Crimson Heat, who hold UK National and European titles were also official cheerleaders for the London Games and are the first UK team to achieve the COA National Title.  The top teams in the country, who have placed admirably well at the 2019 USASF World Championships, are Coventry Dynamite Ammunition (3rd), Rising Stars Ellipse (3rd), Intensity Cheer Extreme (6th), Unity Allstars Black (7th), Rising Stars Midnight (7th) and Unity Allstars Ruby (8th).

References
Megan Charles,

External links
 , Sportcheer England
 , British Cheerleading Association

United Kingdom
Sport in the United Kingdom